Norman Rose (June 23, 1917 – November 12, 2004) was an American actor, film narrator and radio announcer whose velvety baritone was often called "the Voice of God" by colleagues. He was best known as the narrator's voice in the fictitious coffee grower's Juan Valdez Colombian coffee television commercials and the announcer-narrator of NBC's Dimension X.

Born in Philadelphia, Pennsylvania, Rose started acting while a student at George Washington University in Washington, DC. Rose honed his craft at the Actors Studio Drama School in New York, then landed parts in plays on and off-Broadway.

Rose was the narrator for the satirical 1972 hit song Deteriorata, which was recorded by comedy group National Lampoon for the album Radio Dinner. He also recorded numerous books for the blind and narrated the 70th anniversary broadcast of the Academy Awards. He also was a drama instructor at the Juilliard School.

Radio
During World War II, he was recruited by the United States Office of War Information to work as a radio newscaster. After the war, Rose lent his distinctive voice to radio programs such as Dimension X and CBS Radio Mystery Theater. He narrated the short film Harold and the Purple Crayon in 1959, and provided several of the voices on the 1963 CBS cartoon Tennessee Tuxedo and His Tales.

In 1948, Rose co-founded New Stages, an off-Broadway repertory company, with producer David Heilweil. New Stages presented the American debut of Jean-Paul Sartre's best-known play, The Respectful Prostitute, prior to its Broadway run. Rose was an accomplished stage actor appearing in Broadway productions of Richard III and St. Joan and off-Broadway in The Brothers Karamazov.

From 1969 to 1974, Rose stepped in front of the camera to portray the same character—psychiatrist Dr. Marcus Polk—on two ABC soap operas (One Life to Live and All My Children). He also appeared in the soap operas The Edge of Night and Search for Tomorrow.

In addition to his work as the announcer of numerous TV commercials, Rose was one of the voices of promotional announcements for the NBC and later ABC television networks from the late 1960s through the early 1990s.

Films
Nicknamed “The Voice of God” by colleagues because of his deep, recognizable voice, Rose was often cast as something akin to God; conversely, he was the voice of "Death" in Woody Allen's 1975 comedy Love and Death. Rose's other film work includes Woody Allen's Radio Days and the narration for director Kinji Fukasaku's Message from Space (1978), narrating the English dub of the 1968 Soviet Union production of War and Peace and Ishirō Honda's Destroy All Monsters, as well as a newsreel announcer in Mike Nichols’ Biloxi Blues (1988). On screen he was seen in The Joe Louis Story (1953),The Violators (1957), Jump (1971), Sidney Lumet’s The Anderson Tapes (1971), Who Killed Mary What’s Her Name? (1971) and Martin Ritt's The Front (1976) (also starring Woody Allen). He also narrated the 1989 film documentary How Hitler Lost the War, which was produced by David Hoffman.

Rose was also the offscreen narrator for the telecast of Mikhail Baryshnikov's production of the ballet The Nutcracker (1977), a production that has been repeated many times on television and is available on DVD.

Death
Norman Rose died November 12, 2004, at his home in Upper Nyack, New York.

Filmography

References

External links
 Blog of Death
 
 Los Angeles Times obituary
 

1917 births
2004 deaths
American male radio actors
People from Upper Nyack, New York
Male actors from Philadelphia
Military personnel from Philadelphia
American male television actors
American male stage actors
20th-century American male actors
People of the United States Office of War Information